Phyllonorycter sublautella is a moth of the family Gracillariidae. It is found from southern France to Greece.

The larvae feed on Quercus cerris, Quercus pubescens, Quercus robur and Quercus rubra. They mine the leaves of their host plant. They create a lower-surface tentiform mine. The epidermis has one strong fold. The upperside of the mine is barely eaten. The pupa is made inside the mine without an apparent cocoon.

References

sublautella
Moths of Europe
Moths described in 1869